2-Formylbenzoate dehydrogenase (2-carboxybenzaldehyde dehydrogenase, 2CBAL dehydrogenase, PhdK) is an enzyme with systematic name 2-formylbenzoate:NAD+ oxidoreductase. This enzyme catalyses the following chemical reaction

 2-formylbenzoate + NAD+ + H2O  o-phthalic acid + NADH + H+

The enzyme is involved in phenanthrene degradation.

References

External links 
 

EC 1.2.1